Rye Country Day School, also known as Rye Country Day or RCDS, is an independent, co-educational college preparatory school located in Rye, New York. Its Upper School (grades 9–12), Middle School (5–8), and Lower School (Pre-Kindergarten-4) enroll a total of 886 students on its 26-acre campus. Rye Country Day attracts students from over 40 school districts in the tri-state area. The School's $5.9 million financial aid budget provides significant tuition grants to the families of 143 students (16%) in the school. 35% of RCDS students self-identify as people of color.

Academics 
RCDS has three divisions: Lower (Gr. K-4), Middle (Gr. 5-8), and Upper (Gr. 9-12). The school also offers a Pre-K program.

Athletics
Starting in Grade 7, students play interscholastic sports. RCDS has a 45,000-square-foot Athletic Center with basketball and squash courts, locker rooms, a fitness center, and an athletic training room. The sports program has full-time coaches, as well as teachers who coach.

Fall Sports: Cross Country, Field Hockey, Football, Volleyball, and Soccer.
Winter Sports: Basketball, Fencing, Ice Hockey, Squash, Indoor Track and Field, and Wrestling.
Spring Sports: Baseball, Golf, Lacrosse, Sailing, Softball, Tennis, Track and Field.

Campus facilities
The 26-acre campus includes academic buildings; two libraries; administrative buildings; a separate performing arts center with classrooms dance studio and a 450-seat theater-auditorium; a 23,000 square-foot innovative creative arts center; a 40,000 square-foot athletic center; and 4 turf fields.
Two dining rooms serve lunch every day.

Arts Facilities
The Cohen Center for the Creative Arts, a 23,000 square-foot creative arts center, built in 2018. Memorial Hall, built in 2010, seats 125. The Dunn Performing Arts Center has a 450-seat theater, along with dance studios, and band/choral/instrumental rehearsal spaces.

Athletics Facilities
Athletic facilities include four artificial turf fields; the Scott A. Nelson Athletic Center (2000), which houses a two-court gymnasium, four squash courts, four locker rooms, an athletic training facility, a fitness center and a multipurpose gymnasium that serves as the home for the wrestling and fencing programs; the LaGrange Field House (1972) with its indoor ice rink/tennis courts.

History

Rye Country Day School was founded in 1869, when a group of local parents contacted the Reverend William Life and his wife, Susan, who ran a small school in Pennsylvania. The  came to Rye and established the Rye Female Seminary under the direction of Mrs. Life. During its first year, 1869, sixty students (25 boarders and 35 day students) enrolled in the Seminary, which was located on the present school property on Grandview Avenue. In 1896, the Seminary was purchased by the Misses Harriet and Mary Stowe, two members of the faculty. Upon assuming leadership, the Stowe sisters initiated significant changes in the curriculum. During this period, the Seminary was part of a national trend, namely the introduction of college preparatory programs for women. Conscious of the potential financial risk for a strictly proprietary institution, a group of parents bought the Seminary in 1917 and established it as a nonprofit day school under the direction of a Board of Trustees.

The year 1921 saw the Seminary merge with a boys' school from nearby Harrison, the Rye Country School, and became known as the Rye Country Day Schools. In 1928, the "s" was dropped from the word "Schools". At this time, the School offered a program for girls from kindergarten through grade twelve, and a program for boys from kindergarten through grade nine.
In 1964 this pattern of organization was changed when the Board of Trustees extended the enrollment for boys through grade twelve.

Since then, additional property was acquired, buildings were constructed and roads moved. From the construction of the Main Building in 1924, to the additions of the Pinkham Building and the La Grange Field House in the sixties, the Dunn Performing Arts Center in the eighties, the new Lower School classrooms, new dining center and the unveiling of the Athletic Center in the early two-thousands, the turf athletic fields in 2006, the expansion of the Pinkham building to include Memorial Hall in 2010, and the most recent addition of the Cohen Center of the Creative Arts which opened in 2018.

Notable alumni

John Treacy Egan, actor and singer
Raymond Khoury, author
Nick Kroll, actor
Elizabeth W. Smith
Nicola Peltz, actor
Emily Lazar, American Grammy-winning mastering engineer
Barbara Bush, First Lady
Taylor Washington, MLS Player
Barry Mendel, Movie Producer
Leila Pahlavi, Princess of Iran

References

External links
Rye Country Day School

Private K-12 schools in Westchester County, New York
Educational institutions established in 1869
Buildings and structures in Rye, New York
1869 establishments in New York (state)